The 2022 Copa Bicentenario  was a planned tournament with the participation of the 19 teams of the Liga 1, and 14 teams of the Liga 2. The champions would have been entitled to qualify for the 2023 Copa Sudamericana, as well as the Supercopa Peruana against the Liga 1 champions. Sporting Cristal were the defending champions.

The competition was planned to be played starting from July 2022 along with the Clausura tournaments of Liga 1 and Liga 2, but was ultimately cancelled by the Peruvian Football Federation due to scheduling constraints. On 23 August 2022, the FPF officially confirmed the cancellation of the 2022 Copa Bicentenario amid the announcement of planned reforms in Peruvian football.

Teams

Stadia and locations

See also
 2022 Liga 1
 2022 Liga 2
 2022 Copa Perú

References

External links
Official website 
Torneo Descentralizado news at Peru.com 
Torneo Descentralizado statistics and news at Dechalaca.com 

2022
2022 in Peruvian football